Guam competed at the 2011 Pacific Games in Nouméa, New Caledonia between August 27 and September 10, 2011, finishing 14th, with 6 silver and 5 bronze medals. Guam had 312 competitors.

Athletics

Guam has qualified 6 athletes.

Men
Michael Herreros
Derek Mandell -  1500m

Women
Amy Atkinson
Naomi Blaz
Pollara Cobb
Genie Gerardo

Baseball

Guam has qualified a team.  Each team can have a maximum of 20 athletes.

Men -  Team Tournament
Dale Alvarez
Brian Balajadia
Jathan Barnes
Rico Castro
Dominic Cruz
Ryan Martinez
Thomas Morrison
Chad Palomo
John Pangelinan
Jim Reyes
John Salas
Freddy Cepeda Jr
Thomas Sarmiento
Anthony Yatar Jr
Roke Alcantara Jr
Alexander Cruz
Paul Pangelinan
Joseph Tuquero

Basketball

Guam has qualified a men's and women's team.  Each team can consist of a maximum of 12 athletes

Men -  Team Tournament
Andrew Borja
De’Andre Walker
Edgardo Baza
James Stake
Jine Han
John Chaco
Joseph Blas Jr
Romeo Sanchez
Seve Susuico
Shintaro Okada
Vince Estella
William Stinnett

Women
Ann Pajaro
April Pardilla
Brianna Benito
Derin Santos
Ha’Ani Mendiola
Jocelyn Pardilla
Kathryn Castro
Raelene Tajalle

Bodybuilding

Guam has qualified 3 athletes.

Men
Inacay Brando -  -65 kg
Richard Rosete -  -75 kg

Women
Florencia Burke -  -55 kg

Canoeing

Guam has qualified 8 athletes.

Men
Austin Carbullido
Shawn Franquez
Scott Ishizu
Jesse Perez
Kaohu Ruiz
Carl Aguon Jr
Alfred Sgambelluri
William Taitingfong Jr

Football

Guam has qualified a men's and women's team.  Each team can consist of a maximum of 21 athletes.

Men
Brett Maluwelmeng
Julius Campus
Matthew Cruz
Scott Leon Guerrero
Edward Calvo
Shawn Spindel
Ian Mariano
Dominic Gadia
Elias Merfalen
Jason Cunliffe
Christian Schweizer
Dylan Naputi
David Manibusan
Andre Gadia
Jonathan Odell
Joseph Laanan
Mark Chargualaf

Women
Nichole Paulino
Simone Willter
Ashley Besagar
Tatyana Ungacta
Tanya Blas-Cruz
Rachel Jordan
Jannel Banks
Kristin Thompson
Arisa Recella
Aika Young
Alexy Barbe
Phoebe Minato
Tiana Jo Piper
Felicia Alumbaugh
Susanna Schlub
Therese Diaz
Andrea Odell
Jena Cruz

Golf

Guam has qualified 8 athletes.

Men
Mando Iwanaga
Jimmy Mafnas
John Muna
Nathan Zhao

Women
Teresita Blair
Pearl Magallanes
Anna-Rose Tarpley
Nalathai Vongjalorn

Judo

Guam has qualified 5 athletes.

Men
Gen Imai
Mario Manglona
Vandric Castro
Jerome Advincula

Women
Kaiulani Cruz

Rugby Sevens

Guam has qualified a women's team.  Each team can consist of a maximum of 12 athletes.

Women
Jennifer Farley
Kayla Taguacta
Kimberly Taguacta
Maria Sgro
Tiffany Tallada
Stephanie Tanh
Tasi Ada
Kimberly Sherman
Cera Taguacta

Surfing

Guam has qualified 6 athletes.

Men
Richmond Arciaga
Charles Ikehara
Derrick Ikehara
Frederick Mendiola
Cheyne Purcell
Edward Santiago III

Swimming

Guam has qualified 9 athletes.

Men
Pierson Cruz
Christopher Duenas
Rioin Oshiro
Johnny Rivera
Benjamin Schulte -  1500m Freestyle

Women
Jenina Cruz
Jessica Jones
Province Poppe
Pilar Shimizu

Table Tennis

Guam has qualified 2 athletes.

Men
Arman Burgos
Edwin Cadag

Taekwondo

Guam has qualified 5 athletes.

Men
Joseph Ho -  -54 kg
Gilbert Pascua
Terrence Lapitan -  -58 kg
Vincent Garrido

Women
Hang Pham -  -49 kg

Triathlon

Guam has qualified 5 athletes.

Men
Joseph Dela Cruz
Peter Lombaed II -  Mixed Team Sprint
Mark Walters -  Mixed Team Sprint

Women
Kelly Dawes
Chiyo Lombard -  Mixed Team Sprint

Volleyball

Beach Volleyball

Guam has qualified a men's team.  Each team can consist of a maximum of 2 members.

Men
David Rillera Jr
Brian Matanane

Indoor Volleyball

Guam has qualified a men's and women's team.  Each team can consist of a maximum of 12 members.

Men
Kylon Eckert
Charles Macias
Kenneth Leon Guerrero
Raymond Mantanona
Nikolaus Chaco
Micah Herron
John Taimanglo
Miles Herron
Steven Finona
Joshua Cruz
Robert Borden
Tristan Tapia

Women
Crista Nauta
Charmaine Garcia
Colleen Flores
Gemma Datuin
Estella Blass
Shanniqua Mendiola
Jesse Pinkston
Catherine Aquinde
Amy Atkinson
Naomi Blaz
Pollara Cobb

References

2011 in Guamanian sports
Nations at the 2011 Pacific Games
Guam at the Pacific Games